Perfect is the fifteenth full-length studio album by the art punk band Half Japanese. It was released by Joyful Noise Recordings on January 22, 2016.

Track listing

References

2016 albums
Half Japanese albums
Joyful Noise Recordings albums